The 1994 Pepsi Mega season was the fifth season of the franchise in the Philippine Basketball Association (PBA).

Occurrences
Former Swift coach Yeng Guiao becomes Pepsi Mega's third head coach starting the Governors Cup, Guiao replaces Derrick Pumaren, who went over to the RFM franchise as both teams swapped coaches.

Notable dates
September 27: Gido Babilonia sink a bankshot with 3.7 seconds left to lift Pepsi Mega to a 117-116 win over Sta.Lucia as the Bottlers finally win its first game in the conference after four long years at the start of the Governors Cup. The last time Pepsi won a first game was in the first conference of their maiden season in 1990 against then-fellow expansion team Pop Cola.  

October 18: Pepsi Mega trounced Sta.Lucia, 104-96, for its sixth win in eight starts and the victory formalized their entry into the semifinals. 

October 29: Elmer Cabahug drilled in a running three-pointer as time ran out to lift Pepsi Mega to a stunning 110-109 victory over defending champion San Miguel Beermen that reeled off the semifinal round of the PBA Governors Cup in Iloilo City.

Award
Ronnie Coleman was voted the Governor's Cup Best Import, leading the Mega Bottlers to a third-place finish in the season-ending conference.

Roster

Transactions

Trades

Additions

Recruited imports

References

TNT Tropang Giga seasons
Pepsi